Jenni Alpert (birth name is Cameron Morantz) is an American singer-songwriter, guitarist, and pianist. Jenni Alpert is the first unsigned independent artist to ever release an album (Take It All, produced by Mikal Blue) on iTunes under the Mastered for iTunes category which was mastered by Eric Boulanger the designer of Mastered for iTunes. That isn't the only time she was a pioneer for something new. Alpert graduated from UCLA in the Ethnomusicology Department as the first jazz vocalist to complete four-year jazz music program headed by Kenny Burrell. Inspired by the fusion of soul, folk, jazz, and pop, Alpert began self penning songs, co-producing, and recording concept genre albums coining the genre Soul-Americana with her unique take to sound. No stranger to the recording studio, she independently released seven albums before signing a 5 year licensing deal with S-Curve Records (Steve Greenberg) to release her eighth album Until Then which was recorded live in the studio in one take in Nashville, TN with guitarist Guthrie Trapp. Alpert has performed in over 17 countries (United States, Spain, England, Scotland, Ireland, the Netherlands, Belgium, France, Germany, Italy, Sweden, Finland, Australia, India, Nepal, Canada, Mexico, and Israel) with no formal representation solely through the support of fans, acquiring radio play on UK's the BBC, PBS Australia, Triple J, and Sirius XM Radio: The Coffee House.. Upon finding and reuniting with her birth father later in life, Alpert's music and biological reunion story caught wind of adoptees around the country when a short documentary about her life their reunion called "Homeless: the Soundtrack,” filmed and edited by Emmy Award-winning director Irene Taylor Brodsky. This documentary received a Jury Award at Tribeca Film Festival, won best short film at Nantucket Film Festival, was screened at the Laemmle Royal Theater in West Los Angeles, and was also shortlisted for an IDA award in the short doc category.

The documentary shows that Alpert was estranged from both her birth parents after being placed in the foster care system in the early years of her life. Years later, realising that she had missed the opportunity to meet her birth mother while she was alive, Alpert—with the assistance of a private investigator—found and reunited with her biological father. During their first meeting, which was initially all that had been intended, upon introducing herself as her birth nickname "Cami" to connect the early dots of both their pasts, she discovered he was happily homeless, running from the law, and addicted to drugs, but also a musician just like her. A few weeks into their reunion, her birth father chose to leave a life of petty crime and drugs behind to join forces with Alpert. As their incredible developing relationship took flight, she met Chockstone Productions producers Steve Schwartz and Paula Mae Schwartz; the producers heard the details of the reunion story and read ‘Home is Where My Heart Is,’ the self penned article by Alpert and her father of her adoption and of their biological reunion story (published by Groknation and edited by friend Mayim Bialik). Chockstone producer Steve Schwartz introduced Alpert to Irene Taylor Brodsky (an Oscar-nominated, Peabody and Emmy winning documentary film director) who later followed, filmed, and interviewed the dynamic duo during the second phase of their relationship, detailing their life stories apart as well as their reunion and now life together. As Alpert aided her birth father through different stages of rehabilitation, acclimation, and self-discovery and got to know him musically through developing and recording a music report together, documentary maker Brodsky filmed many days of them together editing what was to become the documentary short "Homeless: The Soundtrack”.

Additionally, her music has been featured on US TV shows like ABC's Castle, CBS's CSI Miami, MTV's The Real World, Teen Mom and 16 and Pregnant. Live, Alpert has supported artists such as Loudon Wainwright III, Luka Bloom, Jon Allen, Giovanca, and Kaki King in the US and or in Europe. Upon releasing her first few independent albums on iTunes, Alpert was selected to record her song Untied by The Sun Studio Sessions for PBS at Sun Studios in Memphis, TN, recording home of Elvis, Johnny Cash, Howlin’ Wolf, and B. B. King. Shortly thereafter while touring internationally, an Italian vinyl label (Cappuccino Records), recorded and released a collection of acoustic performances live in Italy. While continuing to tour independently traveling and performing in the US, Jenni recorded a selection of songs live in one take with guitarist Guthrie Trapp in Nashville TN, which eventually garnished the attention of SCurve Records who signed her to a licensing deal and released the album Until Then. After having recorded several times in different studios spanning over a few years, the collection of songs found on her most recent fully produced full-length album, Nothing Less, best reflects and captures her multi-genre soundscape. And upon having reunited with her birth father, who is also a musician, they recorded in the studio the EP: Biological Reunion featuring her birth father's guitar playing.

Alpert's early independent releases include Pieces (2005) produced by drummer producer Jimmy Paxson and Stevie Blacke, 27 Minutes in Bologna (2007) a live vocal and piano set recorded in Italy produced and recorded by Nicola Fantozzi, No Second Guesses (2008) produced by Julian Coryell son of Larry Coryell (except tracks where noted, produced by Jimmy Paxson or Jimmy Messer) mixed by Niko Bolas, and mastered by George Massenburg, which received strong radio play in the Netherlands and was the catalyst for an invitation to do a series of live radio shows hitting most of the Netherlands pop radio airwaves: 'Shouting Boots' Radio 6, Radio 5 at Oba live, Tros Radio Muziekcafe Radio 2, Radio One at Link Atlas, V-radio/Veronica 'studio Schram' lead to supporting the UK artist Jon Allen on his Dutch tour, Underneath the Surface (2010) produced by Brad Smith of Blind Melon which features an ensemble of musicians Jimmy Paxson (drums, Stevie Nicks Ben Harper), Lenny Castro (percussion, John Mayer), Chris Chaney (Bass, Jane's Addiction), Zac Rae (synths Alanis Morissette), and Stevie Blacke (strings, Pink), Take It All (2012) produced by Mikal Blue (Colbie Caillat, Brendan Willing James, Five for Fighting), a fresh blend of pop songs featuring Chris Chaney (Bass), Victor Indrizzo (drums), Dave Levita (guitar), Jeff Babko (organ), Zac Rae (synths), and Stevie Blacke (strings), Shining Light (2013) Alpert's first vinyl, a live performance recorded in Italy, and her most recent work Until Then (2015) released by SCurve Records. She has also recorded in the studio on various projects with Nathaniel Kunkel (producer-engineer) (Russ Kunkel, Dean Parks, Viktor Krauss, Matt Rollings), Marshall Altman (producer-songwriter), and Jimmy Paxson (drummer-producer) (Jimmy Paxson, Deron Johnson, Daryl Johnson, Carlos Rios).

Early life 
Alpert was born in Los Angeles and adopted when she was 4. While spending time in various foster homes, she began to sing and play the piano. Later in her musical development, she learned to play the guitar and started to write poetry and songs. Alpert was selected as one of the first vocalists and granted a scholarship to attend UCLA in the Ethnomusicology Department the four-year jazz music program headed by Kenny Burrell, which granted her the opportunity to study and perform with the likes of Herbie Hancock and Barbara Morrison.

Alpert started Art of Expression, a traveling festival of eclectic sounds, visions, and exhibits designed to bring together musicians from all over the country who support keeping music programs in early childhood education. She currently works to support several nonprofits namely Hope of the Valley Rescue Mission (for those experiencing homelessness) and Celia Center (support for the fostered, the adopted, and all members of the adoption constellation). She also has worked with America's Blood Centers as their first musical key speaker / performer, Musicians on Call, The Downtown Women's Center (LA), Children of the Night, Bridge Point, and KI Foster Care Support Group, for which she is currently a board member..

Discography 
 Biological Reunion (2018)
 Nothing Less (2016)
 Until Then (2015, SCurve Records)
 Shining Light Vinyl (2014)
 Take it All (2012)
 Underneath the Surface (2010)
 No Second Guesses (2008)
 27 Minutes in Bologna (2007)
 Pieces (2005)
 Honest Smile (1999)

References

External links
 Official website

American women singer-songwriters
Living people
Year of birth missing (living people)
Musicians from Los Angeles
Singer-songwriters from California
21st-century American women